Carbohydrate loading, commonly referred to as carb-loading, or carbo-loading, is a strategy used by endurance athletes, such as marathoners and triathletes, to maximize the storage of glycogen (or energy) in the muscles and liver.

Carbohydrate loading is generally recommended for endurance events lasting longer than 90 minutes. Foods with low glycemic indices are generally preferred for carbo-loading due to their minimal effect on serum glucose levels. Low glycemic foods commonly include vegetables, whole wheat pasta, and grains. Many endurance athletes have large pasta dinners the night before an event. Since muscles also use amino acids extensively when functioning within aerobic limits, meals should also include adequate protein. Large portions before a race can, however, decrease race-day performance if the digestive system has not had the time to process the food regimen.

Without depletion
Research in the 1980s led to a modified carbo-loading regimen that eliminates the depletion phase, instead calling for increased carbohydrate intake (to about 70% of total calories) and decreased training for three days before the event.

Short workout
A new carbo-loading regimen developed by scientists at the University of Western Australia calls for a normal diet with light training until the day before the race. On the day before the race, the athlete performs a very short, extremely high-intensity workout (such as a few minutes of sprinting) then consumes  of carbohydrate per kilogram of lean mass over the next 24 hours. The regimen resulted in a 90% increase in glycogen storage when compared to before the carbo-load, which is comparable to or higher than the results achieved with other 2 day – 6 day carbo-loading regimes.

Transient hypoglycemia
Carbohydrate ingestion within 2 hours before aerobic exercise triggers elevated levels of insulin in the blood which may dramatically decrease serum glucose levels. This can limit aerobic performance, especially in events lasting longer than 60 minutes. This is known as transient or reactive hypoglycemia, and can be a limiting factor in elite athletes. Individuals susceptible to hypoglycemia are especially at risk for elevated insulin responses and thus will likely suffer from performance-limiting transient hypoglycemia if they do not follow the correct regimen.

Diet composition
The composition of carbohydrates in the athlete's diet during carbohydrate loading is as important as their share of the overall caloric regimen .

Most dietary carbohydrates consist of varying proportions of two simple sugars, glucose and fructose. Fructose may be metabolized into liver glycogen, but it is ineffective at raising muscle glycogen levels (which is the objective of carbohydrate loading). Consequently, sources of high-fructose carbohydrates, such as fruit and sugar-based foods, are less than optimal for the task. The classic carb-loading meal is pasta, whose caloric content is primarily due to starch, a polymer of glucose. Other high-starch meals which include bread, rice, and potatoes are also part of the correct regimen.

References

Further reading

 
 
 
 
 
 
 
 
 

Endurance games
Sports nutrition
Sports terminology

de:Carboloading#Ausdauersport